WKVM (810 kHz), branded on-air as Radio Paz 810, is a non-commercial AM radio station in San Juan, Puerto Rico.  The station is owned by Grupo RTC, under its licensee, Radio Paz/WKVM-AM Trust.  It airs a mix of Catholic radio programs along with some non-religious shows.

WKVM is powered at 50,000 watts at all times, the only radio station on Puerto Rico with the maximum power day and night.  But because 810 AM is a clear channel frequency, WKVM uses a directional antenna at all times to avoid interference.

External links
FCC History Cards for WKVM

KVM
Radio stations established in 1945
1945 establishments in Puerto Rico
KVM
Catholic radio stations
Catholic Church in Puerto Rico